Altare (L’Atæ in local dialect) is a comune (municipality) in the Province of Savona in the Italian region Liguria, located about  west of Genoa and about  northwest of Savona.

Altare borders the following municipalities: Cairo Montenotte, Carcare, Mallare, Quiliano, and Savona.

Geography
Altare is just west of the Cadibona pass, which at  divides the Ligurian Alps from the Ligurian Apennines. Also called pass of Altare, it is accessed from the coast by the Via Nazionale Piemonte, winding up from Savona and crossing into Piedmont towards the north Italian plain.

History 
Altare was home to an ancient glassmaking tradition, dating back to the Middle Ages. The origin of Altare glassworks is still unknown. Oral tradition has it that the art was spread from Northern France by Benedictine monks. Samuel Kurinsky  posits that the original glassmakers were Sephardic Jews, based on the secretive character of their techniques and the distinct identity of the glassmakers as opposed to the rest of the population.   If that is the case, they were completely assimilated, except for their traditional self-distinction. 
Altarist glassmakers were organized in guilds, not unlike other medieval craftsmen. The guild, known as the University maintained a very strict control over the glassmakers' techniques. Unlike the Venetians though, Altare was a net exporter of know-how throughout its history, as the local guild was never able to prevent the migration of its people to other places. Sometimes it even encouraged it. The importance of Altare revolves around this difference. For example, it appears that Giobatta Da Costa's invention of flint glass took place in London, while he worked for the Ravenscroft manufactory in 1674. Altarist glassmakers operated in France, at Orléans and Nevers and one of them, Bernard Perrot went on to become master of the Royal Glassworks in Orléans, after patenting many innovative techniques. The Museum of Glass in Villa Rosa at Altare preserves many pieces of fine glass produced during this tradition.

References

Further reading 
 The Glass Museum of Altare
 An introduction to the history of Altare 
 Chirico, Mariateresa. Il Museo Dell'arte Vetraria Altarese. Albenga, Litografia Bacchetta. 2009 

Cities and towns in Liguria
Articles which contain graphical timelines